The Botswana Red Cross Society, also known as LRC, was founded in 1968. It has its headquarters in Gaborone, Botswana.

External links
  Botswana Red Cross Society Website
Botswana Red Cross Society Profile

Red Cross and Red Crescent national societies
1968 establishments in Botswana
Organizations established in 1968
Medical and health organisations based in Botswana